Tayfun Pektürk (born 13 May 1988) is a German-Turkish professional footballer who plays as a midfielder or forward for Mittelrheinliga club SV Eintracht Hohkeppel.

Career
Born in Wermelskirchen, Pektürk began his career in 1994 with SV Wermelskirchen. In 2004, he signed for third division side Wuppertaler SV Borussia. He played one year for Wuppertal, before signing for FC Schalke 04 in July 2005.

Pektürk made his debut at the professional level in the 2. Bundesliga for TuS Koblenz on 23 September 2007, when he started the game against 1. FC Köln. On 17 September 2009, he signed for Eintracht Trier, but was demoted into the reserve team in February 2010. On 6 April 2010, Pektürk announced he would leave Eintracht Trier at the end of the season and join SpVgg Greuther Fürth on 1 July 2010.

References

External links
 
 
 

1988 births
Living people
German footballers
Association football midfielders
Association football forwards
Bundesliga players
2. Bundesliga players
Süper Lig players
TFF First League players
TFF Second League players
Regionalliga players
Oberliga (football) players
TuS Koblenz players
SV Eintracht Trier 05 players
SpVgg Greuther Fürth players
İstanbul Başakşehir F.K. players
Karşıyaka S.K. footballers
Utaş Uşakspor footballers
İnegölspor footballers
German people of Turkish descent